The Hægebostad Tunnel is the fifth longest railway tunnel in Norway. It is located in the municipalities of Lyngdal and Hægebostad in Agder county. It was opened in 1943 when the Sørlandet Line was extended west all the way to Moi Station. The tunnel runs through the mountains virtually the entire distance between the stations of Audnedal and Snartemo. The tunnel has a 0.2% horizontal gradient and goes straight except for a curve at entrance on the Audnedal side.

References

Railway tunnels in Agder
Tunnels on the Sørlandet Line
1943 establishments in Norway
Tunnels completed in 1943